Stanislav Serhiyovych Krystin (born 5 September 2001) is a Ukrainian professional footballer who plays as a left midfielder for Ukrainian club Volyn Lutsk.

Personal life
He is the twin brother of Vladyslav Krystin.

References

External links
 Profile on Volyn Lutsk official website
 

2001 births
Living people
People from Volyn Oblast
Ukrainian footballers
Association football midfielders
FC Volyn Lutsk players
Ukrainian First League players
Ukrainian Second League players